Mahadanapuram is a small village situated just 2 miles before Kanyakumari, off the National Highways NH47 and NH7 is Mahadanapuram Agraharam . Earlier the name of this place was called Panchalangala Mahadhanapuram and now the village is called Mahadhanapuram village and Panchalingapuram village. Prior to States Reorganisation, the present Kanyakumari District was in Kerala.  The founder of Travancore was Maharaja Marthanda Varrma.  He was always surrounded by enemies and by his strategy he defeated many chieftains of principalities and consolidated into one compact unit of Travancore. He shifted the capital from Padmanabhapuram (in Kanyakumari District) to Trivandrum and dedicated his kingdom to the feet of Lord Padmanabha of Trivandrum. Hence the Travancore Rulers title start with 'Sri Padmanabha Dasa'.  Perhaps due to a lot of ‘Himsa’ caused to many people during various battles, he donated many lands in villages to people. One such village was
Mahadanapuram. In the Year 1753( 928Kolla Varsham) Sagavarsham 1674. Eighteen vedic Scholars were selected (which included maybe 3 whose mothertongue might be Telugu). Most of them seem to be hailing outside Travancore.  Each of them were given, a house, Agricultural land, to be equally divided between them for cultivation of paddy and small dry land for medicinal plants etc. The Agriculture land which is next to a huge tank called Periakulam (Narikulam ) which gets filled up by rains.  The entire area of land is called ‘ Dana Pramanam’ (Details of this are available in a Copper plate kept at the present Gramam House). The lands were free from all taxes except water Tax which was Rs1/- per acre. (This was abolished during 1930-1940 when the entire land was taxed uniformly as per other lands in the state.)  Later a low lying tank which was in the midst of the fields was filled up and converted to agricultural land and the income was utilised for conducting various festivals and day to day expenses such as cleaning the village, payment to watchmen, payment to Priests of Rig, Yajur, Samavedas for conducting rituals like marriage, upanayanam etc. As time rolled on some of the descendants of the recipients of the Danam migrated to other places for government Service, higher education etc with the result the land was either sold to others.green village

Festival 
On Vijaya Dasami day The Goddess from Kanyakumari comes to this village to kill an Asura The goddess is seated in Silver horse Vahanam and the procession is silent. Just outside the village there is a Mandapam where a bow and arrows are kept. Towards dusk when the Goddess reaches this Tosite, the priest shoots arrows in all four directions and finally shoots on a tender coconut. When this is done symbolizing the killing of the Asura, nagaswarams and other music instruments play to indicate that there is victory over evil. Then the Goddess comes in procession into the village and returns to Kanyakumari late in the night. The expenses towards lighting by lighted cloth balls fixed to poles (cloth balls are drenched in Oil and lighted) and any other incidental expenses for coming to the village from the Mandapam is met by the village.

On this day Mahadanapuram village stands host to visitors who witness this event.

Kanyakumari district